Richmond Annex or The Annex is a neighborhood in southeastern Richmond, California. It is mostly residential and located between San Pablo Avenue/El Cerrito to the east, San Francisco Bay to the west, Central Avenue/Cerrito Creek/Albany Hill/Albany/Alameda County to the south, and Potrero Avenue/Pullman to the north. Carlson Boulevard is the main thoroughfare through the annex, connecting downtown Richmond with downtown El Cerrito.

In the segment of San Pablo Avenue that forms the boundary between Richmond and El Cerrito, the buildings on the western side (which are in Richmond Annex) have an El Cerrito postal address and their occupants are sometimes mistakenly described as being in El Cerrito, such as El Cerrito Natural Grocery Company and Down Home Records (formerly Arhoolie Records).

According to a local history written down by Fay Breneman circa 1941, "The land now known as Richmond Annex was farmed by the Conlon Brothers." The 1894 map showing the final verdict in Emeric V. Alvarado shows the entire Annex as the property of William Meyer (written on map as "Wm. Meyer"). It was annexed by the City of Richmond on September 26, 1926, after a 13-12 vote on whether to join Richmond or El Cerrito. In recent years, Richmond Annex has been home to the Pacific East Mall, a large collection of Chinese stores, the largest of its kind in the East Bay.
Other significant landmarks include: The Richmond Annex Senior Center, which was a firehouse from 1937-1976, and Huntington playground Park. 

The residents have also rallied successfully for a cell phone tower to not be built, had major input on the Carlson boulevard Interstate 80 overpass mural, and kept Fairmont elementary school in neighboring El Cerrito from being closed.

References

External links 

Neighborhoods in Richmond, California